The All-Ireland Senior Hurling Championship 1947 was the 61st series of the All-Ireland Senior Hurling Championship, Ireland's premier hurling knock-out competition.  Kilkenny won the championship, beating Cork 0-14 to 2-7 in the final at Croke Park, Dublin.

Format

Leinster Championship

Quarter-finals: (2 matches) These were two matches between the first four teams drawn from the province.  Two teams were eliminated at this stage while the two winning teams advanced to the semi-finals.

Semi-finals: (2 matches) The winners of the two quarter-finals joined the two remaining Leinster teams to make up the semi-final pairings.  Two teams were eliminated at this stage while the two winning teams advanced to the final.

Final: (1 match) The winners of the two semi-finals contested this game.  One team was eliminated at this stage while the winning team advanced to the All-Ireland semi-finals.

Munster Championship

Quarter-final: (1 match) This was a single match between the first two teams drawn from the province.  One team was eliminated at this stage while the winning team advanced to the semi-finals.

Semi-finals: (2 matches) The winner of the lone quarter-final joined the other three Munster teams to make up the semi-final pairings.  Two teams were eliminated at this stage while the two winning teams advanced to the final.

Final: (1 match) The winners of the two semi-finals contested this game.  One team was eliminated at this stage while the winning team advanced to the All-Ireland semi-finals.

All-Ireland Championship

Semi-finals: (2 matches) The two provincial winners were paired on opposite sides with Galway and Antrim making up the four semi-final teams.  Two teams were eliminated at this stage while the two winning teams advanced to the final.

Final: (1 match) The winners of the two semi-finals contested this game with the winners being declared All-Ireland champions.

Results

Leinster Senior Hurling Championship

Munster Senior Hurling Championship

All-Ireland Senior Hurling Championship

Championship statistics

Top scorers

Overall

In a single game

Scoring

Widest winning margin: 26 points
Cork 7-10 : 0-5 Antrim (All-Ireland semi-final, 3 August 1947)
Most goals in a match: 10
Kilkenny 7-10 : 3-6 Dublin (Leinster final, 13 July 1947)
Most points in a match: 22'
Wexford 3-12 : 2-10 Laois (Leinster quarter-final, 1 June 1947)
Most goals by one team in a match: 7Offaly 7-2 : 2-6 Westmeath (Leinster quarter-final, 8 June 1947)
Kilkenny 7-10 : 3-6 Dublin (Leinster final, 13 July 1947)
Cork 7-10 : 0-5 Antrim (All-Ireland semi-final, 3 August 1947)
Most goals scored by a losing team: 3Wexford 3-8 : 5-11 Kilkenny (Leinster semi-final, 29 June 1947)
Dublin 3-6 : 7-10 Kilkenny  (Leinster final, 13 July 1947)
Most points scored by a losing team: 11' 
Galway 1-11 : 2-9 Kilkenny (All-Ireland semi-final, 27 July 1947)

DebutantesThe following players made their debut in the 1947 championship:Sources

 Corry, Eoghan, The GAA Book of Lists (Hodder Headline Ireland, 2005).
 Donegan, Des, The Complete Handbook of Gaelic Games'' (DBA Publications Limited, 2005).

See also

1947
All-Ireland Senior Hurling Championship